Vailly may refer to the following places in France:

Vailly, Aube, a commune in the Aube department 
Vailly, Haute-Savoie, a commune in the Haute-Savoie department
Vailly-sur-Aisne, a commune in the Aisne department
Vailly-sur-Sauldre,a commune in the Cher department in the Centre region of France.